Matt Schmidt (born June 5, 1979 in Milwaukee, Wisconsin) is a former defender/midfielder who played for American USL First Division side Minnesota Thunder.

Schmidt played soccer at Marquette High School before entering Yale University where he graduated in 2001.  That year, the Milwaukee Wave of the National Professional Soccer League drafted Schmidt in the second round of the NPSL Draft.  That year, he also joined the Minnesota Thunder of the USL A-League, playing with the team until 2006.

References

1979 births
Living people
American soccer players
USL First Division players
Minnesota Thunder players
National Professional Soccer League (1984–2001) players
Major Indoor Soccer League (2001–2008) players
Milwaukee Wave players
Yale Bulldogs men's soccer players
Association football midfielders
Association football defenders